Everything's Archie was a comic book published by Archie Comics from 1969 to 1991. The title served as a vehicle for showcasing the newly created Archie band The Archies, which was featured in the Archie TV cartoon series of the late 1960s and early 1970s. The series follows the exploits of the Archie band, as they meet record execs, play gigs, etc.  Like Betty and Veronica Summer Fun and World of Archie, it was part of the Archie Giant Series. Everything's Archie was cancelled because the Archies were fading at the character's 50th anniversary. The company was also readying up for series such as Betty, Veronica, Jughead's Time Police, Archie 3000, and the Archie Americana Series.

References

1969 comics debuts
1991 comics endings
Comics magazines published in the United States
Archie Comics titles
Defunct American comics
Magazines established in 1969
Magazines disestablished in 1991
Teen comedy comics
Bimonthly magazines published in the United States